The Armstrong Lie is a 2013 American documentary film directed by Alex Gibney about the cyclist Lance Armstrong. Originally titled The Road Back, the film takes its name from "Le Mensonge Armstrong", the headline of the August 23, 2005 issue of the French newspaper L'Équipe. The film was screened out of competition at the 70th Venice International Film Festival and in the Special Presentation section at the 2013 Toronto International Film Festival.

Synopsis
In 2009, director Alex Gibney set out to film The Road Back, a documentary on cyclist Lance Armstrong's comeback year after a four-year retirement from the sport. Three years later, in October 2012, a doping investigation led to his lifetime ban from competition and the stripping of his seven Tour de France titles, and the documentary was shelved. On January 14, 2013, three hours after his appearance on Oprah, Armstrong went back to Gibney to set the record straight about his career.

Cast
Lance Armstrong
Reed Albergotti
Frankie Andreu
Betsy Andreu
Johan Bruyneel
Alberto Contador
Daniel Coyle
Michele Ferrari
George Hincapie
Steve Madden
Filippo Simeoni
Bill Stapleton
Bill Strickland
Jonathan Vaughters
David Walsh

The documentary includes footage from Larry King Live, The Daily Show and the South Park episode "A Scause for Applause".

Reception
Reviews of the documentary have been positive, with an 83% approval rating on Rotten Tomatoes based on 122 reviews, with an average rating of 6.90/10. The site's critics' consensus reads: "Smartly constructed and scathingly sharp, The Armstrong Lie presents an effective indictment of its unscrupulous subject -- as well as the sports culture that spawned him." On Metacritic, the film has a weighted average score of 67 out of 100 based on 37 reviews, indicating "generally favorable reviews".

In his review for The Observer, Mark Kermode wrote: "Armstrong comes across as both admirably resilient and frighteningly selfish, his treatment of those who crossed him … tellingly callous, his refusal to be beaten bizarrely engaging", and gave the film a score of 4/5 stars. Peter Howell of the Toronto Star gave the film a score of 3/4 stars, writing: "Gibney gives the truth as full an airing as seems humanly possible, given that the subject is a world-class liar." Peter Travers of Rolling Stone also gave the film a score of 3/4 stars, writing: "The movie rambles at two-plus hours, but the provocation never stops." Kate Muir of The Times wrote: "The tale is fascinating, not just for cycling enthusiasts, but connoisseurs of the human condition." Boyd van Hoeij of The Hollywood Reporter called the film "A quite absorbing but never riveting or revelatory overview of Armstrong's career and testy personality."

Philippa Hawker of The Sydney Morning Herald gave the film a score of 3/5 stars, writing: "This is not a story about doping, it is a story about power, someone observes; Armstrong exercised and abused it, with the complicity of many in the cycling world." Peter Bradshaw of The Guardian gave the film a score of 3/5 stars, describing it as "a striking but flawed documentary" and writing: "the slippery doper hedges his general admission with all sorts of hints that this matter wasn't quite what his accusers have said, and Gibney circles around his man, never quite going in for the kill." Deborah Ross of The Spectator wrote that the film was "fascinating as far as it goes but it may not go as far as you would like, and may not ask the questions you would like", and concluded: "As I said, it's entirely possible you can't get to the heart of Armstrong because there is no heart, but I'd like to have seen someone have a go."

References

External links
 
 

2013 films
2013 documentary films
American sports documentary films
Documentary films about cycling
Documentary films about sportspeople
Doping at the Tour de France
Films directed by Alex Gibney
Films produced by Frank Marshall
Films produced by Matt Tolmach
Films shot in Austin, Texas
Films shot in California
Films shot in Colorado
Films shot in France
Films shot in Italy
Lance Armstrong
Sony Pictures Classics films
2010s English-language films
2010s American films